Elachista hallini is a moth of the family Elachistidae that is endemic to Austria.

References

hallini
Moths described in 1992
Endemic fauna of Austria
Moths of Europe